KeyFilm  is a film & television production company located in Amsterdam, Netherlands specialized in the development and production of motion pictures, documentaries and television series for many platforms. The company was founded in 2008 by owner and producer Hanneke Niens. Co-founder and producer Hans de Wolf has been associated with KeyFilm as an advisor as of 2022. The production company has built up an extensive international network of co-producers and financers. This resulted in collaborations with (among others) ITVS, Eurimages, the British Film Institute, Chios Investments, Al Jazeera and Netflix.

Awards
Many films received various (inter)national awards among which an Academy Award nomination Best foreign language film for Twin Sisters (2004), an International Emmy Award for telemovie De uitverkorene (The Chosen One) (2006) and the Prix Europa for Television Programme of the Year for De uitverkorene (The Chosen One) and Cloaca.

Notable box office hits were Twin Sisters, Bride Flight, Soof, Soof 2, Soof 3 and So What is Love. In addition movies were selected for the international film festivals of Berlin (Nena), Toronto (Unfinished Sky, The Idol), San Sebastián (Godforsaken, Silent City), Venice (Queens) and International Film Festival Rotterdam (Family, Craving, Night of a 1000 Hours, The Beast in the Jungle, Beyond Sleep, Tench, A House in Jerusalem).

Selected filmography
A House in Jerusalem (2023)
Soof 3 (2022)
Queens (2022)
Swanenburg (season one, 2021)
The Warden (2020)
Tench (2020)
Dreamlife (2020)
So What Is Love (2019)
The Beast in the Jungle (2019)
The Reports on Sarah and Saleem (2018)
Soof: A new Beginning (two seasons, 2017-2018)
Craving (2017)
Soof 2 (2016)
Night of a 1000 Hours (2016)
Beyond Sleep (2016)
The Idol (2015)
Ventoux (2015)
Nena (2014)
Soof (2013)
Silent City (2012)
Richting West (2010)
Bollywood Hero (2009)
The Dark House (2009)

External links
 
 Netherlands film commission: KeyFilm

References

Film production companies of the Netherlands
Dutch companies established in 2008
Mass media companies established in 2008
Television production companies of the Netherlands
Mass media in Amsterdam